Patrick Harlan is an American-born Japanese entertainer, comedian, and voice actor. He is known for being a member of the comedy duo, Pakkun Makkun, and is also known by his stage name Pakkun.

Life and career

Harlan was born in Denver, Colorado, and graduated from Harvard University with a degree in the Comparative Study of Religion. He first came to Japan on a tour with the Harvard Glee Club in 1993. He lived in Fukui and taught at an English conversation school. He studied Japanese on his own and passed the highest level of the Japanese Language Proficiency Test after 2 years in the country. He moved to Tokyo in 1996 to pursue an acting career.

In 1997, Harlan and Makoto Yoshida formed the comic duo Pakkun Makkun, with Harlan as the boke (funny guy) and Yoshida as the tsukkomi (serious guy). They were the first international pair on the Japanese comedy scene in decades. They quickly made a name for themselves, winning the Tokyo FM King of Comedy Tournament and making it to the finals of NHK's Shinjin Engei Taisho both in 1999. They were also finalists on NHK's Bakusho Onair Battle in 2000. Pakkun Makkun became regular face on Japanese television with a daily corner on the popular afternoon show Just on TBS for five and a half years. Pakkun Makkun took their Manzai style to Las Vegas in 2004 and Los Angeles in 2007, performing both times in English with their straight man and funny guy roles reversed.

In addition to comedy, Harlan works as an actor, DJ, commentator, and TV show host. As a solo performer Patrick became well known as the host of NHK's Eigo de Shabera Night, and later the secondary host or "Friday Partner" of Nihon Television's Omoikkiri Ii Terebi with Mino Monta. From 2010 to 2014, Harlan was the main MC of 7Sta Bratch and 7Sta Live on TV Tokyo. In the 2010s, Harlan began commenting on news and current events and in 2015 became the moderator of "GAIKOKUJIN KISHAHA MITA (Through Foreign Journalists' Eyes)" a weekly current affairs discussion program on BS-TBS television. He was the anchor of Fuji Television's Hodo Prime Sunday in 2018, and the Wednesday night anchor for Abema Prime from 2015 to 2019. Since 2012, he has been an adjunct professor at Tokyo Institute of Technology teaching courses in Communication and Rhetoric and International Relations Theory.

Television 
 Corner personality on "JUST." TBS Television 1999–2005
 Host of "EIGO DE SHABERANAITO / Can You Speak English." NHK 2003 to 2009
 Secondary Host of "OMOIKKIRI II TEREBI," Nihon Television 2007-2009
 Host of "7-STA Live" and 7-STA BRATCH," TV Tokyo 2010–2014
 Panelist on "IMA SEKAI HA," Nihon Television 2012–
 Co-host of "Rika's Tokyo Cuisine" segment of "Dining with the Chef" 2013–
 Host of "GAIKOKUJIN KISHAHA MITA / Through Foreign Journalists' Eyes," BS-TBS 2015–2018

Voice work 
 Jack Morton in Gamera 2000 (1997)
 Pirate in Doraemon: Nobita's Great Adventure in the South Seas (1998)
 Deep Freeze (1999)
 Robert Wells in Shenmue (2000)
 Ark Thompson in Resident Evil Survivor (2000)
 Silpheed: The Lost Planet (2000)
 Steel Battalion (2002)
 Hero in D.N.A.: Dark Native Apostle (2002)
 Gongon and Dr. Bad-Boon in Super Monkey Ball 2 (2002)
 Narrator in Little Charo: Tohoku-hen
 David Rice in Neuro: Supernatural Detective (ep. 14) (2008)
 Jack Waltz in Detective Conan: Dimensional Sniper (2014)

Books 
 爆笑問題・パックンの英語原論 (Bakusho Mondai and Pack'n Tackle English (full edition)), Gentosha, 2001
 爆笑問題・パックンのニュースで英語を学ぶ本 (Bakusho Mondai and Pakkun Learn English from the News), Gentosha, 2002
 パックンマックンの笑われる英語 笑わせる英語 (Pakkun Makkun's English to Get Laughed At, English to Get A Laugh), Seishun Shuppan, 2002
 小卒レベルのおれがラスベガスで英語で漫才ができた理由 (How I, With Grade School Level English, Came to Perform MANZAI in English in Las Vegas), Gentosha, 2004
 Pakkun's English Dictionary, Gakushu Kenkyusha, 2004
 爆笑問題・パックンの読むだけで英語がわかる本 (Bakusho Mondai and Pakkun Tackle English (revised)), Gentosha, 2005
 パックンマックンの「使いこなせ! カタカナ語」ビジネス編 仕事で役立つ頻出300語マスター (Pakkun Makkun's Useful Katakana English for Business), Shogakukan, 2006
 パックンの英語絵本「トゥースフェアリーの大冒険」 (The Tooth Fairy's Big Adventure (picture book. text and illustration by Patrick Harlan)), Shogakukan, 2006
 パックンの中吊り英作文　(Pakkun's Headline English), CNN Publishing, 2006
 「何とぞよしなに」って、英語で言えますか (Let's Talk Business), NHK出版、2012
 Are you a 国際人 ("Are you an International Person"), Chuoseihan, 2013
 パックンマックン・海保知里の笑う英作文　(Pakkun Makkun and Chisato Kaiho's Laughable English Composition),  Fusosha, 2013
 TSUKAMU ! WAJUTSU (Speak to Achieve) Kadokawa 21, 2014
 大統領の演説　(The Presidents' Speech), Kadokawa, 2016
 世界に通じる子を育てる (Raising Kids who Meet the World), Daiwa Shobo, 2017
 世界に渡り合う外交術 (Diplomacy to Cross the World), Mainichi Shinbun Publishing, 2017
 日本のバイアスを外せ　(Removing the Japan Bias), Shogakukan, 2018

References

External links 
 Official Home Page
 Eigo De Shabera Night
 Omoikiri Ii Terebi
 Make on the Holiday Blog
 digisbs.com/tv/program/michibura
 
 

1970 births
Living people
20th-century American comedians
20th-century American male actors
21st-century American comedians
21st-century American male actors
Academic staff of Tokyo Institute of Technology
American DJs
American expatriates in Japan
American male comedians
American male television actors
American male video game actors
American male voice actors
American television hosts
Comedians from Colorado
Comedians from Tokyo
Expatriate television personalities in Japan
Harvard University alumni
Male actors from Colorado
Male actors from Denver
Male actors from Tokyo
Teachers of English as a second or foreign language